Ivan Petkov (born 22 January 1985) is a Bulgarian footballer who currently plays for Etar Veliko Tarnovo II as a striker.
Petkov started his career at Zagorets Nova Zagora and joined Kaliakra Kavarna in 2007.

References

External links

Bulgarian footballers
1985 births
Living people
Association football forwards
PFC Kaliakra Kavarna players
PFC Spartak Varna players
SFC Etar Veliko Tarnovo players
First Professional Football League (Bulgaria) players
People from Veliko Tarnovo
Sportspeople from Veliko Tarnovo Province